Alexander Yuryevich Khochinsky (February 29, 1944, Leningrad  —  April 11, 1998, St. Petersburg) was a Soviet and Russian stage and film actor, bard. Honored Artist of the RSFSR (1980).

Biography
Born into the family of the pop singer Yury Khochinsky (1924-1948) and the leading actress of the Bryantsev Youth Theatre Lyudmila Krasikova (1923-2003).

He graduated from the  Saint Peter's School. He played in the Bryantsev Youth Theatre (more than 60 roles in performances of different genres), including the role of Gandalf in the play by Tolkien The Ballad of the Glorious Bilbo Baggins, and Satire Theater on Vasilievsky. Since the 1980s, he worked a lot in entreprise in Moscow and St. Petersburg.

After the expulsion from the Bryantsev Youth Theatre in 1988, the chief director Zinovy Korogodsky left the theater along with many of his students and associates, including his wife Antonina Shuranova. For some time they worked in the small theater Interatelye, then in 1994 they organized the own Globus  Theater. Since 1991 he has been an actor at the Lenfilm film studio.

He had excellent vocal skills, sang both in the theater and in the cinema. According to one of the founders of the art song genre in Russia. 

Buried at Serafimovskoe Cemetery.

Selected filmography
 No Path Through Fire (1968) as Red Army soldier
 Bumbarash (1971) as Lyovka Demchenko
 Shadow (1971) as solo singer
 The Woman who Sings (1978) as Valentin Sergeevich
 Squadron of Flying Hussars (1980) as narrator
 The General (1992) as Boris Pasternak
 Life and Adventures of Four Friends 1/2 (1992) as military sailor

References

External links
 

1944 births
1998 deaths
Male actors from Saint Petersburg
Russian bards
Soviet male singer-songwriters
Honored Artists of the RSFSR
Russian male actors
Soviet male actors
Saint Peter's School (Saint Petersburg) alumni